Gennady Golovkin vs. David Lemieux was a middleweight unification professional boxing match contested between WBC interim, WBA (Super), and IBO champion, Gennady Golovkin and IBF champion, David Lemieux. The bout took place at Madison Square Garden on October 17, 2015.

Background 
The card was promoted by Golden Boy Promotions and K2 Promotions. The bout was to unify the WBA (Super), IBF, WBC interim, and IBO middleweight titles. The PPV buys were 150,000. Tom Loefler of K2 Promotions said after the GGG vs. Jacobs fight that GGG vs. Lemieux did 163,000 PPV buys.

Broadcast 
The telecast of the fight was televised via HBO PPV.

References 

Boxing matches
2015 in sports in New York City
2015 in boxing
October 2015 sports events in the United States